Araripemys is an extinct marine turtle genus from 112 to 109 million years ago, in the Early Cretaceous Crato and Romualdo Formations of the Araripe Basin in northeastern Brazil. It is one of the oldest known pleurodires.

References 

Pleurodira
Prehistoric turtle genera
Early Cretaceous turtles
Albian life
Prehistoric turtles of South America
Early Cretaceous reptiles of South America
Cretaceous Brazil
Fossils of Brazil
Crato Formation
Romualdo Formation
Fossil taxa described in 1988
Extinct turtles